Parliamentary elections were held in Gabon on 24 February 1980. The country was a one-party state at the time, with the Gabonese Democratic Party as the sole legal party, thereby winning all 89 seats in the enlarged National Assembly. Voter turnout was 108% of the number of registered voters, although this was caused by voters being able to register on election day.

Results

References

1980 in Gabon
Gabon
Elections in Gabon
One-party elections
February 1980 events in Africa